Graf-Engelbert School is an urban high school for boys and girls in Bochum, Germany. Near the center of the city and the tree-lined Königsallee, it is located on Else-Hirsch-Straße. Else Hirsch was a teacher in Bochum during the Nazi era and organized ten children's transports, saving many lives, though she herself was murdered in the Holocaust.

Graf-Engelbert School is only a few hundred meters from the Schiller School (also a high school). Due to that proximity, there are common courses (also including the Albert Einstein School) in all subjects in the upper classes.

At one point, Graf-Engelbert was a boys-only high school, but was combined with a girls' high school which was then located near the Schiller School. Currently, 67 teachers teach approximately 930 students at Graf-Engelbert.

Notable alumni
 Wolfgang Clement, politician
 Otto Schily, politician

References

External links
 Graf-Engelbert School Home Page

Gymnasiums in Germany
Schools in North Rhine-Westphalia
1910 establishments in Germany
Educational institutions established in 1910